Irina Bara and Valentina Ivakhnenko were the defending champions, but both players chose not to participate.

Manon Arcangioli and Kimberley Zimmermann won the title, defeating Victoria Rodríguez and Ioana Loredana Roșca in the final, 2–6, 6–3, [10–6].

Seeds

Draw

Draw

References
Main Draw

Engie Open de Biarritz - Doubles